Calliostoma spectabile is a species of relatively large deepwater sea snail, a marine gastropod mollusk in the family Calliostomatidae.

Some authors place this taxon in the subgenus Calliostoma (Maurea)

Description
The size of the shell varies between 45 mm and 55 mm.
The large, solid, imperforate shell has a conical shape. It is flesh-colored or yellowish, dotted with pink on the spiral ribs. The surface is spirally ribbed, the ribs
coarsely granose, numbering about 7 on the penultimate whorl, some of them small. On the base of the shell there are about 8 concentric ridges, scarcely beaded except the two or three inner ones. The spire is conical, much broader than usual in Calliostoma. The sutures are slightly impressed. There are about 6 whorls. These are nearly flat, the last one is obtusely angled at the periphery. The base of the shell is rather flattened. The rounded aperture is quadrangular, very similar in shape to that of Calliostoma punctulatum. It is nacreous, iridescent and sulcate within. The pearly columella is arcuate.

Distribution
This marine species occurs off New Zealand, off Auckland Island and Campbell island at intertidal depths.

References

 Marshall, 1995. A revision of the recent Calliostoma species of New Zealand (Mollusca:Gastropoda:Trochoidea). The Nautilus 108(4):83–127

External links
 

spectabile
Gastropods described in 1855